Tan Wu Meng (born 1975) is a Singaporean politician and oncologist who served as Senior Parliamentary Secretary for Foreign Affairs and Senior Parliamentary Secretary for Trade and Industry concurrently between 2018 and 2020. A member of the governing People's Action Party (PAP), he has been the Member of Parliament (MP) representing the Clementi division of Jurong GRC since 2015.

Education 
Tan was educated at Raffles Institution and Hwa Chong Junior College before he went to the University of Cambridge, where he studied medicine at Trinity College. He was the recipient of an A*STAR International Fellowship and a Cambridge MBBS-PhD programme scholarship, allowing him to train as a doctor and complete a research doctorate at the Medical Research Council Laboratory of Molecular Biology. Tan also holds a Master of Medicine in internal medicine from the National University of Singapore and a Fellowship of the Academy of Medicine, Singapore, in medical oncology.

While at university, Tan was the President of the Cambridge Union Society in 2001. He represented Cambridge as a debater, reaching the Grand Final of the World Universities Debating Championships in Stellenbosch in 2003 where he was ranked the Best Individual Speaker of the tournament.

Career 
Tan began his medical career as a specialist in medical oncology at the National Cancer Centre at the Singapore General Hospital. He served as the Director of Outpatient Care for the Division of Medical Oncology. He was also a Pro-Tem Committee Member for the Sengkang Hospital Project and a member of the SingHealth Specialist Outpatient Clinic Task Force. He was a member of the Executive Committee of the Singapore Society of Oncology from 2012 to 2014.

Political career 
From 2006 to 2009, Tan served with the North West Community Development Council as a Councillor and Vice-Chair of the Youth Works Sub-Committee. He was a member of the Senja-Cashew Youth Executive Committee 2007 to 2011 and also sat on the Senja-Cashew Citizens' Consultative Committee from 2010 to 2013.

In 2008, at the age of 33, Tan was elected the Organising Secretary of the PAP's youth wing, the Young PAP. He was the first person to hold the role of elected Young PAP Organising Secretary after it was created and served in the role until 2010.

During the 2015 general election, Tan was a member of the People's Action Party (PAP) team contesting in Jurong GRC. Tan was elected to Parliament when the five-member PAP team in Jurong GRC defeated the SingFirst team by 95,080 votes (79.3%) to 24,848 (20.7%).

Tan served as a backbencher in Parliament until May 2018 when he was appointed as a Senior Parliamentary Secretary to the Ministry of Foreign Affairs and Ministry of Trade and Industry.

Tan is a member of the PAP team defending Jurong GRC in the 2020 general election. He was then appointed chairperson of the Health Government Parliamentary Committee (GPC) in the 14th Parliament.

Personal life 
Tan is married to an infectious diseases doctor and has two daughters.

References

External links
 Tan Wu Meng on Parliament of Singapore

Members of the Parliament of Singapore
People's Action Party politicians
Singaporean oncologists
Presidents of the Cambridge Union
Alumni of Trinity College, Cambridge
Singaporean people of Teochew descent
1975 births
Living people